The following are the national records in athletics in Guam maintained by its national athletics federation: Guam Track and Field Association (GTFA).

Outdoor

Key to tables:

ht = hand timing

y = denotes one mile

A = affected by altitude

# = not officially ratified by IAAF

OT = oversized track (> 200m in circumference)

Men

Women

‡: wind assisted by another source

Indoor

Men

Women

Notes

References

Guam
Records